Radushne is an urban-type settlement in Kryvyi Rih Raion of Dnipropetrovsk Oblast in Ukraine. It belongs to Novopillia rural hromada, one of the hromadas of Ukraine. Population:

Economy

Transportation
Radushna railway station, located in Radushne, is on the railway connecting Kryvyi Rih with Apostolove and further with Dnipro, Kherson, and Zaporizhia.

Radushne is on Highway H23 which connects Kryvyi Rih and Zaporizhia.

References

Urban-type settlements in Kryvyi Rih Raion